Neil Albert Pope  (born 3 March 1949) is a former Australian politician. He was the Labor member for Monbulk in the Victorian Legislative Assembly from 1982 to 1992. and served as a Minister in the Labor Governments of John Cain II and Joan Kirner.

He was the Victorian Minister for Labour from 1988 to 1992, Minister for Youth Affairs from 1988 to 1991 and Minister for School Education from January to October in 1992. Pope lost his seat in October 1992, when the Kennett Liberal Government was elected.

Neil Pope was appointed the 36th Administrator of Norfolk Island from 1 April 2012, initially for a two-year term. He completed this appointment on 30 June 2014.

On 1 December 2017 the Federal Attorney-General Senator George Brandis appointed Neil Pope as a part-time member of the Administrative Appeals Tribunal for a period of 7 years.

Early life 
Neil Pope was born in Melbourne.

He was educated at Christ Church Grammar School, Caulfield Grammar School, Swinburne Institute of Technology (now Swinburne University) and the Royal Melbourne Institute of Technology (now RMIT University).

Before politics 
Between 1973 and 1976 Neil Pope was an Assistant Accountant and Assistant Town Clerk in Victorian local government.

In 1976 he became an Industrial Officer with the Municipal Officers Association.

In 1979 until 1982 he served as a councillor on the Shire of Lillydale.

State politics 
In April 1982 Pope was elected to the Parliament of Victoria in the electorate of Monbulk. He defeated Bill Borthwick who was Deputy Premier of Victoria at the time. Pope was re-elected in 1985 and 1988, but lost his seat in the Victorian election of October 1992.

Following the Victorian election of 1988 Neil Pope was elected to the Victorian Cabinet. He was a Government Minister until the defeat of the Labor Government in 1992. He served as Minister for Labour (1988–1992), Minister for Youth Affairs (1988–1991) and Minister for School Education (1991–1992).

After politics 
In February 1993 he established Neil Pope and Associates, a human resource management consultancy, specialising in mediation and workplace reform.

Appointment as Administrator of Norfolk Island 
On 13 February 2012 the Minister for Regional Australia announced that Neil Pope had been appointed as the 36th Administrator of Norfolk Island.

Pope's term commenced on 1 April 2012 and was initially for two years. He was replaced by Gary Hardgrave on 1 July 2014.

Personal 
Pope was awarded a Centenary Medal in January 2001 for service to the community through industrial relations, local government and parliament.

In the Australia Day 2015 Honours list, Pope was made a Member of the Order of Australia (AM) for significant service to the community of Victoria, particularly through local and state government roles, and to the administration of Norfolk Island.

See also
 List of Caulfield Grammar School people

References

 

1949 births
Living people
Administrators of Norfolk Island
Members of the Victorian Legislative Assembly
Members of the Order of Australia
Recipients of the Centenary Medal
Politicians from Melbourne
Swinburne University of Technology alumni
RMIT University alumni
People educated at Caulfield Grammar School
Australian Labor Party members of the Parliament of Victoria